Rach may refer to:
 Random Access Channel (RACH), a feature of mobiles or other wireless devices
 Rach, Iran, a village in South Khorasan Province, Iran
 Sergei Rachmaninoff, the composer. "Rach" is a colloquial short form of his surname, most commonly used to refer to some of his compositions, such as "Rach 2" (Piano Concerto No. 2) "Rach 3" (No. 3)
 Rachel (given name). "Rach"  is the colloquial short form of this given name
 Royal Aberdeen Children's Hospital or RACH, a paediatric hospital, in Aberdeen, Scotland

Other
 Johannes Rach (1720–1783), Danish painter who sketched Batavia (now Jakarta, Indonesia) in the 17th century
 Rach, the traditional name for Saint Dismas in the Eastern Orthodox Churches